Podsabotin is a village in the Municipality of Brda in the Littoral region of Slovenia, right on the border with Italy.

The parish church in the settlement is dedicated to Saint Nicholas and belongs to the Koper Diocese. Another small church belonging to the same parish is built in the hamlet of Podsenica and is dedicated to Saint Lawrence.

References

External links
Podsabotin on Geopedia

Populated places in the Municipality of Brda